Huub Harings (born 31 January 1939) is a Dutch former professional racing cyclist. He rode in four editions of the Tour de France. He also won the Dutch National Cyclo-cross Championships five times: in 1963, 1966, 1967, 1969 and 1970.

References

External links
 

1939 births
Living people
Dutch male cyclists
Cyclo-cross cyclists
People from Eijsden-Margraten
Cyclists from Limburg (Netherlands)
20th-century Dutch people